Hat Yai Football Club (Thai สโมสรฟุตบอลหาดใหญ่ ) is a Thai semi professional football club based in Hat Yai, Songkhla Province. They currently play in Thai League 4 Southern Region.

Stadium and locations

Season By Season record

P = Played
W = Games won
D = Games drawn
L = Games lost
F = Goals for
A = Goals against
Pts = Points
Pos = Final position

TPL = Thai Premier League
DIV1 = Division 1 League
DIV2 = Division 2 League
SOUTH = Regional League South Division

QR1 = First Qualifying Round
QR2 = Second Qualifying Round
QR3 = Third Qualifying Round
QR4 = Fourth Qualifying Round
RInt = Intermediate Round
R1 = Round 1
R2 = Round 2
R3 = Round 3

R4 = Round 4
R5 = Round 5
R6 = Round 6
GR = Group stage
QF = Quarter-finals
SF = Semi-finals
RU = Runners-up
S = Shared
W = Winners

Player

Current squad

External links
 Official Website
 Official Facebookpage

Association football clubs established in 2010
Football clubs in Thailand
Sport in Songkhla province
2010 establishments in Thailand